Mick Takeuchi (竹内未来 Takeuchi Miku born July 4) is a Japanese manga artist, best known for her eleven-volume series Her Majesty's Dog (Joō-sama no Inu), which has been translated into English by Go! Comi as they were very popular in Japan. All eleven volumes of Her Majesty's Dog have now been published in English, as well as Bound Beauty and A Wise Man Sleeps. All of her manga were licensed by the now defunct Go! Comi, only Her Majesty's Dog was completely released to America while only a few volumes of Bound Beauty and A Wise Man Sleeps were released.

Takeuchi was a guest of honor at Anime Expo 2006 in Anaheim, California.

Ever since she was 13 years old, she knew she wanted to create manga. One of her influences is Rumiko Takahashi, in particular Takahashi's series Urusei Yatsura. To relax, she enjoys playing with her miniature schnauzers, Milky and Kentarō. Although "Miku" is a traditional Japanese given name, "Mick" Takeuchi is actually named after Mick Jagger.

Published works

External links
Mick Takeuchi Official Site (in Japanese only)
Go! Comi, manga Web site of her English-language publisher
Her Majesty's Dog #1, review, by K. Avila, Sequential Tart, June 2006
Her Majesty's Dog #2, review, by K. Avila, Sequential Tart, June 2006
Her Majesty's Dog #3, review, by K. Avila, Sequential Tart, July 2006

Living people
Manga artists from Aichi Prefecture
Year of birth missing (living people)